John T. Howe was a state legislator in North Carolina. He represented New Hanover County in the North Carolina House of Representatives in 1897.
Alfred Howe was his father. John worked for Alexander Manly's Daily Record newspaper as a general traveling agent. He was a Republican.

He opposed Republican governor Russell on a railroad bill.

See also
African-American officeholders during and following the Reconstruction era

References

19th-century American politicians
Members of the North Carolina House of Representatives
Year of birth missing
Year of death missing